is a research professor of organic chemistry in the Department of Chemistry, Graduate School of Science, Kyoto University (Japan). He is recognized in the fields of porphyrinoid chemistry for his works in extended π-electron systems and its tunable aromatic behaviors.

Osuka has published research concerning extremely long porphyrin arrays, extensively π-conjugated porphyrin tapes, large porphyrin wheels, an antiaromatic porphyrin sheet, porphyrin belts, and porphyrin barrels. He has explored the properties of Meso-aryl expanded porphyrins for its transannular reactions and splitting reactions. He has used meso-aryl expanded porphyrins as a scaffold to study twisted Möbius aromatic and antiaromatic systems.

Osuka introduced a new class of real congeners of contracted porphyrins, which he named subporphyrins.

Early life
Osuka was born on 16 October 1954 in Gamagōri, Aichi Prefecture, Japan.

Education
In 1977, Osuka completed his B.S., Faculty of Science from Kyoto University. In 1982, he received his PhD from the Department of Chemistry, Kyoto University.

Academic career
From 1979 to 1984, Osuka served at Ehime University as an assistant professor. He returned to Kyoto University, and served as an assistant professor from 1984 to 1987, and as an associate professor from 1987 to 1996. In 1996, he was named as a professor at Kyoto University, where he worked until his retirement in 2020.

Osuka served as a visiting professor at the University of Burgundy in 2006 and 2009, and also at the Chinese University of Hong Kong in 2006.

From 2001 to 2007, Osuka was the Project Leader of "Creation of Bio-devices and Bio-systems with Chemical and Biological Molecules for Medical Use" at the Japan Science and Technology Agency.

On the occasion of his 65th birthday and his retirement, in 2020, from Kyoto University, a special issue of the Journal of Porphyrins and Phthalocyanines was dedicated to honouring Osaka and his achievements. As a mark of respect for his work in this field, T. K. Chandrashekar and J. Sessler were among the fifty-five scholar-contributors who submitted their research papers to be published in his honour.

Osuka's influence in the field of porphyrin chemistry, due to his scientific discoveries, were mentioned in the foreword to the issue. Of note were the preparation of various extended porphyrins as Huckel-Möbius (anti) aromaticity switching models, structural rearrangements and "creation of a vast array" of new π conjugated structures of "tremendous aesthetic appeal".

Awards and recognition
 1988 Chemical Society of Japan Young Chemists award
 1999 The Japanese Photochemistry Association Award at 13th International Symposium on Novel Aromatic Compounds (ISNA-13; Luxembourg)
 2009 Nozoe Memorial Lectureship Award (International Symposium on the Chemistry of Nonbenzenoid Aromatic Compounds)
 2010 Chemical Society of Japan Award
 2016 Robert Burns Woodward Career Award in Porphyrin Chemistry Lifetime Achievement Award
 2020 Journal of Porphyrins and Phthalocyanines Special issue of the journal, dedicated to  Osaka.

Publications

References

External links
 Group Page

21st-century Japanese scientists
Living people
Japanese chemists
1954 births
People from Gamagōri
20th-century Japanese scientists
20th-century chemists
21st-century chemists
Kyoto University alumni
Academic staff of Kyoto University